Miran Srebrnič (born 8 January 1970) is a Slovenian professional football manager and former player.

He has played for Gorica between 1993 and 2007, making 400 appearances in the Slovenian PrvaLiga.

International career
Srebrnič has made six appearances for the Slovenia national team between 1996 and 1998.

References

External links

Miran Srebrnič at NZS 

1970 births
Living people
People from Nova Gorica
Slovenian footballers
Association football defenders
NK Brda players
ND Gorica players
Slovenian Second League players
Slovenian PrvaLiga players
Slovenia international footballers
Slovenian football managers
ND Gorica managers
FC Koper managers